Legislative Assembly elections were held in the Indian state of Rajasthan on 7 December 2018. The Indian National Congress became the single largest party with 100 seats, short of majority by 1 seat. The Bharatiya Janata Party won 73 seats, much lower compared to the previous election in which it won an absolute majority of 163 seats. The Indian National Congress formed the government with the Bahujan Samaj Party.

Background 
The tenure of Rajasthan assembly ended on 20 January 2019. The main political contenders are the BJP, INC, BSP and the RLP. Most of the bypolls preceding the election were won by the Indian National Congress. There was a lot of anti-incumbency and infighting in the BJP government, which eventually led to a Congress victory.

Schedule 
The date of the election was 7 December 2018 and the result was announced on 11 December 2018.

Opinion polls

Exit polls 
The exit polls gave a clear edge to the Indian National Congress.

Results 
 

The seat and vote share was as follows:

Region-wise

Elected Members

See also
 Elections in India
 2018 elections in India

References

External links
Election Commission of India
The Article

Rajasthan
2018
2018